Pagsanghan, officially the Municipality of Pagsanghan, is a 5th class municipality in the province of Samar, Philippines. According to the 2020 census, it has a population of 7,959 people.

History

Pagsanghan is municipality located interior of San Agustin, Gandara, Samar along the National Road, and nearby the sea where its name came from. The islet of Bangon and the islet of Cambaye were two-of-two branching river going out to the sea which in local language called Sanga, Guin-sangahan or Pinag-sangahan.

Pagsanghan is the trading center of historical missionaries located in Dapdap, Tarangnan, Samar, were religious Jesuits settle.

Geography

Barangays
Pagsanghan is politically subdivided into 13 barangays.

 Bangon
 Buenos Aires
 Calanyugan
 Caloloma (Rawis)
 Cambaye
 Canlapwas (Poblacion)
 Libertad (Poblacion)
 Pange
 San Luis
 Santo Niño (Poblacion)
 Viejo (Poblacion)
 Villahermosa Occidental
 Villahermosa Oriental

Climate

Demographics

Economy

Infrastructure

Water and Sanitation The town water system is somewhat different here. They use artesian aquifers. Every household must have an Artesian JetMatic pump. Houses located near the coastline have long pipelines going into the forest for JetMatic pumping.

Solid Waste Management A garbage dumping site of the town is located right along the Provincial Road going and before the town, after Villahermosa. A garbage truck collects the wastes of the citizens here.

References

External links
 Pagsanghan Profile at PhilAtlas.com
 [ Philippine Standard Geographic Code]
 Philippine Census Information
 Local Governance Performance Management System

Municipalities of Samar (province)